Kenneth James Grandberry (January 25, 1952 – February 27, 2022) was an American football running back in the National Football League. He was drafted by the Chicago Bears in the eighth round of the 1974 NFL Draft. He played college football at Washington State.

In his lone season in the NFL, Grandberry led the Bears in rushing with 475 yards and two touchdowns on 144 carries. The following year, future Pro Football Hall of Famer Walter Payton was drafted.

Grandberry died on the February 27, 2022 at the age of 70.

References

1952 births
2022 deaths
American football running backs
Washington State Cougars football players
Chicago Bears players
Sportspeople from Waco, Texas